Schaer, Schär, or Schar is a surname and may refer to:

Fabian Schär (born 1991), Swiss footballer
Jean-Marc Schaer (born 1953), French retired professional football striker
Michael Schär (born 1986), Swiss professional road bicycle racer
Manuela Schär, Swiss Paralympic athlete
Gary Schaer (born 1951), American Democratic Party politician
Dwight Schar (born 1942), an American businessman, philanthropist, and Republican Party financial supporter
Fritz Schär (1926–1997), Swiss cyclist
Andrew Schär (born 1981), South African-born composer, actor, and musician
Miriam Schaer, American artist
Robin Beth Schaer, American poet